The Kalispell Main Street Historic District is a historic district in Kalispell, Montana, United States.  It was listed on the National Register of Historic Places in 1994, under the name "Main Street Commercial Historic District."  Sixteen years later, the district was renamed and its boundaries were expanded.

References

Historic districts on the National Register of Historic Places in Montana
National Register of Historic Places in Flathead County, Montana
Kalispell, Montana